Al-Adhamiya Sport Club is an Iraqi sports club based in Al-Adhamiyah, Baghdad, whose football team plays in Iraq Division Two.

History

Early years
Al-Adhamiya was founded in 1951 and competed in the Iraq Central FA League from 1957–58 until 1959–60 when they were relegated.

Al-Jumhouriya Al-Olympi
In 1967, Al-Adhamiya merged with Al-Jumhouriya Al-Olympi to form Markaz Al-Shabab Al-Adhamiya. Al-Jumhouriya Al-Olympi were a club founded in 1934 as Al-Olympi Al-Malaki, later renaming to Al-Malaki in 1943, Al-Jumhouriya in 1958 and Al-Jumhouriya Al-Olympi in 1959. Under the name Al-Malaki, the club had competed in the first edition of the Iraq Central FA League and the first edition of the Iraq FA Cup. Al-Malaki housed the first headquarters of the Iraq Football Association (IFA) in the late 1940s and early 1950s and helped organise the IFA competitions in Baghdad.

In Premier League
In 1974, the club returned to the name Al-Adhamiya. Al-Adhamiya team played in the Iraqi Premier League for the first time in the 1980–81 season, and the team was not good enough, and finished the season at the bottom of the standings, and eventually relegated to the Iraq Division One.

Managerial history

  Sattar Jawad
  Nazar Nayef

Honours
Iraq Division One
Winners (1): 1979–80

Famous players
Jamil Abbas (1946–1949)
Nazar Ashraf (1970–1974)

References

External links
 Al-Adhamiya SC on Goalzz.com
 Iraq Clubs- Foundation Dates

1951 establishments in Iraq
Association football clubs established in 1951
Football clubs in Baghdad
Sport in Baghdad